Belligobio nummifer is a species of cyprinid fish endemic to China.  It is found in the Yangtze,  Lingjiang, and Fuchunjiang Rivers.

References

  

Cyprinid fish of Asia
Belligobio
Freshwater fish of China
Fish described in 1901